Arnaha may refer to:

Arnaha, Janakpur, Nepal
Arnaha, Sagarmatha, Nepal